Jongiyeh (also Romanized as Jongīyeh, Jangeyeh, and Jangīyeh) is a village in Kut-e Abdollah Rural District, in the Central District of Karun County, Khuzestan Province, Iran. At the 2006 census, its population was 4,183, in 666 families.

References 

Populated places in Karun County